Eternal Damnation is the second full-length album released by Cypriot Power metal band Winter's Verge. It was recorded in Germany and released in April 2008 by Limb Music Productions. The album combines elements of metal. The music is characterized by fast-paced riffs, double-bass drumming and vocals, with interspersed keyboard parts and composition influenced by other music.

Track listing 
Lyrics by George Charalambous.  Music by George Charalambous, Harry Pari and Stefanos Psillides.
  Eternal Damnation 4:46   
  My Winter Sun 4:52   
  Get Me Out 3:55   
  Hold My Hand 5:09   
  A Secret Once Forgotten 5:25   
  Goodbye 5:42   
  Spring Of Life 4:09   
  Can You Hear Me 5:18   
  For I Have Sinned 3:02   
  To You I Sail Tonight 6:35   
  Suicide Note 3:31

Personnel

Winter's Bane
George Charalambous - Vocals
Perikles Mallopoulos - Guitars
Stefanos Psillides - Keyboards
Miguel Trapezaris – Bass
Andreas Charalambous – Drums

Additional personnel
R.D. Liapkis: Additional backing vocals

References

2008 albums
Winter's Verge albums
Limb Music albums